The Benabderrahmane government (Arabic: حكومة بن عبد الرحمان) is the forty-ninth government of the People's Democratic Republic of Algeria. It is a government formed by Aymen Benabderrahmane under President Abdelmadjid Tebboune, following 2021 legislative election and the dissolution of the Third Djerad government on 7 July 2021.

Composition

Ministers

Deputy Ministers (Deleguate Ministers)

Secretary General

References

External links 

 Official announcement

Cabinets established in 2021
Government of Algeria
2021 establishments in Algeria
Current governments
2020s in Algeria